The House of the Devil is a 2009 American horror film written, directed, and edited by Ti West, starring Jocelin Donahue, Tom Noonan, Mary Woronov, Greta Gerwig, A. J. Bowen, and Dee Wallace.

The plot concerns a young college student who is hired as a babysitter at an isolated house and is soon caught up in bizarre and dangerous events as she fights for her life.

The film combines elements of both the slasher film and haunted house subgenres while using the "satanic panic" of the 1980s as a central plot element. The film pays homage to horror films of the 1970s and 1980s, recreating the style of films of that era using filming techniques and similar technology to what was used then. The film's opening text claims that it is based upon true events, a technique used in some horror films, such as The Amityville Horror and The Texas Chain Saw Massacre.

Plot
Samantha Hughes, a cash-strapped college student, responds to an ad for a babysitting job for a Mr. Ulman. Her best friend Megan gave her a ride to the Ulmans' remote mansion. Mr. Ulman reveals he actually needs Samantha to tend to his wife's mother. Samantha reluctantly agrees to a fee of $400. On the way home, Megan is shot in the head by a stranger (later identified as Victor).

Samantha orders a pizza from a number Mr. Ulman had repeatedly recommended. After accidentally breaking a vase, she cleans up the mess and discovers a cupboard containing old family photographs. In one photograph, a family that is not the Ulmans stands next to the Volvo that she and Megan saw at the house. Later, three corpses are shown in one of the rooms, implying that they were the family in the photographs and the true residents of the house.

Unnerved by noises in the house and the arrival of the pizza, delivered by Victor, Samantha dials 911 but tells the operator that it was an accidental call. Drugs in the pizza cause her to pass out just as she sees movements behind a door on the third floor. 

Samantha comes to during a lunar eclipse and finds herself bound in the center of a Pentagram on the floor. Mr. and Mrs. Ulman, along with their son Victor, begin a ritual. "Mother" is revealed to be a grotesque, witch-like figure. She slices her arm and pours her blood into a goat skull. She then uses it to draw occult symbols on Samantha's belly and forehead, and forces Samantha to drink the blood.

Samantha stabs Mother and escapes. After finding Megan's corpse in the kitchen, she kills Victor and Mrs. Ulman, but horrific images of Mother begin appearing in her mind. Mr. Ulman chases her into a nearby cemetery, telling her that she was chosen and destined to accept "him". Samantha threatens to shoot Ulman, but he is resigned, telling her it is too late. Instead, Samantha shoots herself in the head. 

Elsewhere, a TV news reports a strange lunar eclipse the night before, which confounded scientists due to its abrupt ending. 

Samantha lies unconscious on a hospital bed, her head in bandages. A nurse pats her belly, saying "You will be just fine. Both of you,” implying that she has been impregnated.

Cast
Jocelin Donahue as Samantha Hughes
Tom Noonan as Mr. Ulman
Mary Woronov as Mrs. Ulman
Greta Gerwig as Megan
A. J. Bowen as Victor Ulman
Dee Wallace as Landlady
Danielle Noe as Mother

Additionally, Lena Dunham voices a 911 operator and writer-director Ti West appears as a teacher.

Production
The film was shot in Connecticut. Taking place in the 1980s, the film was shot on 16mm film, giving it a retro stylistic look that matched the decade. Similarly, some aspects of the culture of the 1980s—i.e. feathered hair, Samantha's 1980 Sony Walkman, the Fixx's 1983 song "One Thing Leads to Another", the Greg Kihn Band's 1981 song "The Breakup Song (They Don't Write 'Em)", and the Volvo 240 sedan—are seen in the film as signifiers of the decade. The cinematography of the film also reflects the methods used by directors of the time. For instance, West often has the camera zoom in on characters (rather than dolly in as is now common in film), a technique that was often used in horror films of the 1970s and continued to be used into the 1980s. Other stylistic signifiers include opening credits (which became less common in films in the decades after the 1980s) in yellow font, accompanied by freeze-frames, and the closing credits being played over a still image of the final scene.

Release
The United States premiere was at the 2009 Tribeca Film Festival in New York City on April 25. It was made available through video on demand on October 1, 2009. The film was given a limited theatrical release in the United States on October 30, 2009. The DVD and Blu-ray of the film were released on February 2, 2010. A promotional copy of the film was released on VHS in a clamshell box like the ones that many early VHS films of the 1980s came in.

Soundtrack
The soundtrack for The House of the Devil was released in November 2009 as a double feature with the score of I Can See You, both by composer Jeff Grace.

 Opening (1.10)
 Family Photos (2.24)
 The View Upstairs (1.45)
 Original Inhabitants (3.05)
 Meeting Mr. Ulman (1.12)
 Keep the Change (1.12)
 Footsteps (1.27)
 Mother (3.07)
 Chalice (0.51)
 On the Run (3.45)
 Lights Out (3.04)
 He's Calling You (1.50)
 The House of the Devil (5.49)
 Mrs. Ulman (2.04)

Tracks from 15 to 26 comprise the soundtrack for I Can See You.

Reception
The film received a score of 87% on Rotten Tomatoes based on 98 reviews; the site's consensus states that "Though its underlying themes are familiar, House of the Devil effectively sheds the loud and gory cliches of contemporary horror to deliver a tense, slowly building throwback to the fright flicks of decades past." It also received an aggregate score of 73 on Metacritic, based on 18 critic ratings, indicating "Generally favorable reviews."

Roger Ebert gave it 3 out of 4 stars, complimenting its use of subtlety and tension as being "an introduction for some audience members to the Hitchcockian definition of suspense." Oliver Smith of 7films similarly compared it to staples of the genre, praising that "as the great horror films of past days, such as The Omen or Rosemary’s Baby, The House of the Devil is a slow-burning horror film". Kevin Sommerfield from Slasher Studios gave the film four out of four stars, commenting that the film is "not just a nostalgia piece for director Ti West, one of the best horror directors working today", but that it also reflected "how horror movies should be made".

Self-proclaimed redneck film critic Joe Bob Briggs has praised the film as "just a superb slow-burn, extremely well-crafted movie."

In a review for Salon, Stephanie Zacharek indicated that she liked the movie, declaring it "clever" and "somewhat a novelty". Zacharek perceived it as "obviously made with love", though conceding that the film is likely "not going to change the face or direction of horror filmmaking in any drastic way".

Some critics were less kind, critiquing the pacing or originality of the film. Kyle Smith of the New York Post admitted that it was "creepy", but that it took "a little too long to arrive" at its climatic culmination. Kirk Honeycutt from The Hollywood Reporter judged the film to be derivative, rather than flatteringly imitative, calling the film and its genre "banal".

The film won a few awards shortly after its release, but was largely absent from most major competitions and film festivals, and from the public eye, possibly due to its limited theatrical release and low budget. It won the 2009 Birmingham Sidewalk Moving Picture Festival award for Best Feature Film. At 2009 Screamfest, it won festival trophies for Best Actress (Jocelin Donahue) and Best Score (Jeff Grace).

See also
List of films featuring eclipses

References

External links
 
 
 
 
 Spout interview with director Ti West
 Interview with Ti West about The House of The Devil at ion magazine

2009 films
2009 horror films
American supernatural horror films
2009 independent films
Films about cults
Films set in the 1980s
Films shot in Connecticut
American haunted house films
Glass Eye Pix films
Films directed by Ti West
Films about witchcraft
Films about Satanism
Films set in country houses
2000s English-language films
2000s American films